Tang Xijing (born January 3, 2003) is a Chinese artistic gymnast.  She is the 2019 World all-around silver medalist, matching Jiang Yuyuan at the 2010 World Championships for the highest all-around finish for a Chinese woman in World or Olympic history. She is also the 2020 Olympic silver medalist on balance beam and the 2022 Chinese national all-around champion.  At the junior level she is the 2018 Youth Olympic balance beam champion and uneven bars bronze medalist.

Career

Junior

2018 
Tang won the gold medal as part of the Chinese team with He Licheng, Qi Qi, Yin Sisi, and Zhao Shiting at the 2018 Asian Junior Championships in Jakarta, Indonesia. Individually, she won the gold on balance beam ahead of Yin and Eum Doh-yun of South Korea. Tang won the bronze medal in the all-around at the 2018 Chinese National Championships behind Luo Huan and Zhang Jin. She won silver with the Beijing team and placed fourth in the uneven bars final.

Tang competed at the 2018 Youth Olympic Games in Buenos Aires, Argentina where she qualified third into the all-around final and all event finals except vault. She placed fourth in the all-around after falling twice on beam. In event finals, Tang won gold on balance beam ahead of Russia's Ksenia Klimenko and Great Britain's Amelie Morgan, and bronze on uneven bars behind Klimenko and Giorgia Villa of Italy. She also placed fourth on floor.

Senior

2019 
Tang was named to the Chinese team for the 2019 City of Jesolo Trophy with Liu Tingting, Qi Qi, and Zhang Jin, where they won the silver medal behind the United States. She individually placed fourth in the all-around and won silver on the uneven bars. At the 2019 Chinese National Championships, she won silver with the Beijing team and on balance beam behind junior Ou Yushan, as well as fourth in the all-around.

Tang was named to the Chinese team for the 2019 World Championships in Stuttgart, Germany alongside Chen Yile, Li Shijia, Liu Tingting, Qi Qi, and Zhang Jin. She helped the team qualify in second behind the United States and was the first reserve on uneven bars. Tang failed to qualify to the all-around final due to the two-per-country rule. She competed on vault, where she debuted a new double-twisting Yurchenko vault, uneven bars, and floor during the team final to help China place fourth behind the United States, Russia, and Italy after the team counted three falls.

Tang replaced Liu in the all-around final after Liu's withdrawal. Despite qualifying in 21st place to the all-around, since she was replacing sixth-place qualifier Liu, she was seeded in the top rotating group. Tang hit four strong routines to win a surprise silver medal in the all-around behind five-time world champion Simone Biles of the United States and ahead of 2019 European Games Champion Angelina Melnikova of Russia. She recorded the second-highest beam score of the day behind Biles. This finish marks the highest placement of a female Chinese gymnast in World Championships or Olympic history, matching Jiang Yuyuan's second-place finish at the 2010 World Championships. It was also the first all-around medal won by a Chinese woman at the World or Olympic level since Yao Jinnan's bronze medal at the 2011 World Championships.

2020 
After the postponement of the 2020 Summer Olympics due to the COVID-19 pandemic, Tang competed at the delayed Chinese National Championships in September. As the reigning World all-around silver medalist, Tang was a favorite for the title. In the qualification round, which also served as the team final, Tang and Qi Qi led the Beijing provincial team to a fourth consecutive silver medal. Individually, a major error on uneven bars and a fall on balance beam caused Tang to miss qualifying for both of those event finals and to enter the all-around final in sixth place. However, a strong performance on floor featuring a new full-twisting double tuck allowed her to qualify to that final in third place behind Qi and reigning national champion Shang Chunsong. After qualifications, Tang said she felt physically stronger and that she hoped to overcome her pattern of making errors in the first round of a competition.

In the all-around final, Tang improved on her qualifications performance to place fifth in the two-day combined all-around standings. Tang recorded the top beam score of the day by a wide margin after landing her new double pike dismount and earned the fourth-highest score on both vault and floor exercise. Another major error on the uneven bars prevented her from making the all-around podium, with her training mates Wei Xiaoyuan and Qi Qi ultimately taking silver and bronze. In the floor exercise final, Tang also placed fifth with a clean routine, less than a tenth from the podium.

2021 
On 3 July, Tang was selected to represent China at the 2020 Summer Olympics alongside Lu Yufei, Ou Yushan, and Zhang Jin; they finished seventh as a team. On 3 August she competed in the balance beam event final and won the silver medal behind compatriot Guan Chenchen.

2022 
Tang competed at the 2022 Asian Championships in June.  While there she helped China place first as a team.  Individually she won silver in the all-around behind Zhang Jin and on the uneven bars behind Wei Xiaoyuan.  At the Chinese National Championships Tang placed first in the all-around.  Additionally she placed third on uneven bars behind Luo Rui and Wei Xiaoyuan and eighth on floor exercise.

Selected competitive skills

Competitive history

References

External links 
 

2003 births
Living people
Chinese female artistic gymnasts
Gymnasts at the 2018 Summer Youth Olympics
Youth Olympic gold medalists for China
Medalists at the World Artistic Gymnastics Championships
Gymnasts at the 2020 Summer Olympics
Olympic gymnasts of China
Medalists at the 2020 Summer Olympics
Olympic silver medalists for China
Olympic medalists in gymnastics
21st-century Chinese women